Garuda Indonesia Flight 865 (GA/GIA 865) was a scheduled international flight from Fukuoka, Japan, to Jakarta, Indonesia via Bali, Indonesia. On 13 June 1996, Flight 865 crashed on its takeoff from runway 16 at Fukuoka Airport. Three of the 275 on board suffered fatal injuries in the accident.

Accident 
Flight 865 was cleared for takeoff from Runway 16. Suddenly, the crew of the McDonnell Douglas DC-10-30, Captain Ronald Longdong (42), First Officer Yudhia Putra and Flight Engineer Dwi Prayitno, attempted to abort take-off after the failure of the number 3 (right) engine. The abort occurred at speeds nearing V2, and after rotation of the nose. Following the abort, attempts were made to stop the aircraft on the runway by use of brakes, ground spoilers and thrust reversers, but the crew was unable to stop the aircraft within the boundaries of the runway, which exited the airport property. The captain stated that he feared that the aircraft might hit buildings or objects if he did not abort the takeoff.

In slowing down, the aircraft slid through a ditch, a fence and a road before finally coming to rest approximately  beyond the runway threshold. Damage done to the aircraft during the slide across the ground caused the landing gear to break off and both wing-mounted engines to be torn from the wings. The fuselage broke in two places, at about the wing root trailing edge, and at approximately  aft of the wing root trailing edge. The resultant fire destroyed the areas between the hull fractures, and other areas of the aircraft. The bodies of 3 men were later discovered in the back of the wreckage of the plane. Two of the passengers  in seats 34K and 35K died as a result of the violent impact; the third fatality, seated in 35J was rendered unconscious by the impact and was unable to escape the spreading inferno.

The final report concluded that pilot error and the failure of the maintenance and flight operation sections of the airline in properly coordinating matters resulted in the accident.

Aircraft
The aircraft involved was a McDonnell Douglas DC-10-30, registration PK-GIE. It had its first flight on 24 April 1979 and was delivered to Garuda Indonesia on 27 July 1979. The aircraft was 17 years old at the time of the accident, it was the 284th DC-10 built and its MSN number was 46685.

Engine details 
The aircraft had three General Electric CF6-50C2 turbofan engines. The cause of the engine failure leading to the crash was that the engine turbine blades had been in service for 6,182 cycles (take-offs and landings) when General Electric said to discard blades after 6,000 cycles.

Aftermath

The former aircraft registration number (PK-GIE) was later used on one of Garuda Indonesia's Boeing 777-3U3 ERs.

References

External links 

  Aircraft Accident Investigation Report – Aircraft Accident Investigation Commission (Archive)
  Aircraft Accident Investigation Report – Aircraft Accident Investigation Commission
 Aviation Safety Database

1996 in Japan
Accidents and incidents involving the McDonnell Douglas DC-10
Airliner accidents and incidents involving runway overruns
Aviation accidents and incidents in 1996
Flight 865
History of Fukuoka Prefecture
Aviation accidents and incidents in Japan
June 1996 events in Asia
Airliner accidents and incidents caused by engine failure
Aviation accidents and incidents caused by pilot error
1996 disasters in Japan